Ocyllus is a genus of spiders in the family Thomisidae. It was first described in 1887 by Tamerlan Thorell. , it contains 2 species, both found in Myanmar.

References

Thomisidae
Thomisidae genera
Spiders of Asia
Taxa named by Tamerlan Thorell